Southern Tenant Folk Union is a  Scottish folk group based in Edinburgh. The group combines English and Celtic folk sounds with American bluegrass music.

The band was formed by five-string banjo player Pat McGarvey, who was born in Belfast.

The band performed on BBC One's The Andrew Marr Show on 15 September 2013.

There is additionally an electronic version of the band led by Pat McGarvey called The Southern Tenant making synth and soundtrack related music that have released two albums to date, and have a third coming out on 30/9/2022 called Halloween Hits Vol. 1

Discography

|}

References

External links
 Official website

2006 establishments in Scotland
British bluegrass music groups
Musical groups established in 2006
Scottish folk music groups